Centromere protein M also known as proliferation associated nuclear element 1 (PANE1)  is a protein that in humans is encoded by the CENPM gene.

An alternative transcript of the CENPM gene encodes a leukocyte antigen that is selectively expressed in B-lymphoid cells. Centromere protein M is involved in centromere assembly and immune response.

References

Further reading

External links